In finance, a hidden asset is an asset that is not shown on a balance sheet. An example of such an asset is the US$15 billion that United Airlines' frequent flyer program, MileagePlus, was estimated to be worth when it filed for Chapter 11 bankruptcy.

In divorce cases, a hidden asset is a property that is hidden by one spouse from the other and, as a result, is more difficult to discover during divorce proceedings.

References 

Asset